Marko may refer to:

 Marko (given name)
 Marko (surname)
 Márkó, a village in Hungary

See also 
Marco (disambiguation)
Markko (disambiguation)
Marka (disambiguation)
Markov
Marku